Absolute dating is the process of determining an age on a specified chronology in archaeology and geology. Some scientists prefer the terms chronometric or calendar dating, as use of the word "absolute" implies an unwarranted certainty of accuracy.  Absolute dating provides a numerical age or range, in contrast with relative dating, which places events in order without any measure of the age between events.

In archaeology, absolute dating is usually based on the physical, chemical, and life properties of the materials of artifacts, buildings, or other items that have been modified by humans and by historical associations with materials with known dates (such as coins and historical records). For example, coins found in excavations may have their production date written on them, or there may be written records describing the coin and when it was used, allowing the site to be associated with a particular calendar year. Absolute dating techniques include radiocarbon dating of wood or bones, potassium-argon dating, and trapped-charge dating methods such as thermoluminescence dating of glazed ceramics.

In historical geology, the primary methods of absolute dating involve using the radioactive decay of elements trapped in rocks or minerals, including isotope systems from younger organic remains (radiocarbon dating with ) to systems such as uranium–lead dating that allow determination of absolute ages for some of the oldest rocks on Earth.

Radiometric techniques

Radiometric dating is based on the known and constant rate of decay of radioactive isotopes into their radiogenic daughter isotopes. Particular isotopes are suitable for different applications due to the types of atoms present in the mineral or other material and its approximate age. For example, techniques based on isotopes with half-lives in the thousands of years, such as carbon-14, cannot be used to date materials that have ages on the order of billions of years, as the detectable amounts of the radioactive atoms and their decayed daughter isotopes will be too small to measure within the uncertainty of the instruments.

Radiocarbon dating

One of the most widely used and well-known absolute dating techniques is carbon-14 (or radiocarbon) dating, which is used to date organic remains. This is a radiometric technique since it is based on radioactive decay. Cosmic radiation entering Earth's atmosphere produces carbon-14, and plants take in carbon-14 as they fix carbon dioxide. Carbon-14 moves up the food chain as animals eat plants and as predators eat other animals. With death, the uptake of carbon-14 stops.

It takes 5,730 years for half the carbon-14 to decay to nitrogen; this is the half-life of carbon-14. After another 5,730 years, only one-quarter of the original carbon-14 will remain.  After yet another 5,730 years, only one-eighth will be left.

By measuring the carbon-14 in organic material, scientists can determine the date of death of the organic matter in an artifact or ecofact.

Limitations
The relatively short half-life of carbon-14, 5,730 years, makes dating reliable only up to about 60,000 years. The technique often cannot pinpoint the date of an archeological site better than historic records but is highly effective for precise dates when calibrated with other dating techniques such as tree-ring dating.

An additional problem with carbon-14 dates from archeological sites is known as the "old wood" problem. It is possible, particularly in dry, desert climates, for organic materials such as dead trees to remain in their natural state for hundreds of years before people use them as firewood or building materials, after which they become part of the archaeological record. Thus, dating that particular tree does not necessarily indicate when the fire burned or the structure was built.

For this reason, many archaeologists prefer to use samples from short-lived plants for radiocarbon dating. The development of accelerator mass spectrometry (AMS) dating, which allows a date to be obtained from a very small sample, has been very useful in this regard.

Potassium-argon dating

Other radiometric dating techniques are available for earlier periods.  One of the most widely used is potassium–argon dating (K–Ar dating).  Potassium-40 is a radioactive isotope of potassium that decays into argon-40.  The half-life of potassium-40 is 1.3 billion years, far longer than that of carbon-14, allowing much older samples to be dated. Potassium is common in rocks and minerals, allowing many samples of geochronological or archeological interest to be dated.

Argon, a noble gas, is not commonly incorporated into such samples except when produced in situ through radioactive decay. The date measured reveals the last time that the object was heated past the closure temperature at which the trapped argon can escape the lattice. K–Ar dating was used to calibrate the geomagnetic polarity time scale.

Luminescence dating

Thermoluminescence
Thermoluminescence testing also dates items to the last time they were heated.  This technique is based on the principle that all objects absorb radiation from the environment.  This process frees electrons within minerals that remain caught within the item.

Heating an item to 500 degrees Celsius or higher releases the trapped electrons, producing light.  This light can be measured to determine the last time the item was heated.

Radiation levels do not remain constant over time.  Fluctuating levels can skew results – for example, if an item went through several high radiation eras, thermoluminescence will return an older date for the item.  Many factors can spoil the sample before testing as well, exposing the sample to heat or direct light may cause some of the electrons to dissipate, causing the item to date younger.

Because of these and other factors, Thermoluminescence is at the most about 15% accurate.  It cannot be used to accurately date a site on its own.  However, it can be used to confirm the antiquity of an item.

Optically stimulated luminescence (OSL)
Optically stimulated luminescence (OSL) dating constrains the time at which sediment was last exposed to light. During sediment transport, exposure to sunlight 'zeros' the luminescence signal. Upon burial, the sediment accumulates a luminescence signal as natural ambient radiation gradually ionises the mineral grains.

Careful sampling under dark conditions allows the sediment to be exposed to artificial light in the laboratory which releases the OSL signal. The amount of luminescence released is used to calculate the equivalent dose (De) that the sediment has acquired since deposition, which can be used in combination with the dose rate (Dr) to calculate the age.

Dendrochronology

Dendrochronology or tree-ring dating is the scientific method of dating based on the analysis of patterns of tree rings, also known as growth rings. Dendrochronology can date the time at which tree rings were formed, in many types of wood, to the exact calendar year.

Dendrochronology has three main areas of application: paleoecology, where it is used to determine certain aspects of past ecologies (most prominently climate); archaeology, where it is used to date old buildings, etc.; and radiocarbon dating, where it is used to calibrate radiocarbon ages (see below).

In some areas of the world, it is possible to date wood back a few thousand years, or even many thousands.  Currently, the maximum for fully anchored chronologies is a little over 11,000 years from present.

Amino acid dating

Amino acid dating is a dating technique used to estimate the age of a specimen in paleobiology, archaeology, forensic science, taphonomy, sedimentary geology and other fields.  This technique relates changes in amino acid molecules to the time elapsed since they were formed. All biological tissues contain amino acids.  All amino acids except glycine (the simplest one) are optically active, having an asymmetric carbon atom. This means that the amino acid can have two different configurations, "D" or "L" which are mirror images of each other.

With a few important exceptions, living organisms keep all their amino acids in the "L" configuration.  When an organism dies, control over the configuration of the amino acids ceases, and the ratio of D to L moves from a value near 0 towards an equilibrium value near 1, a process called racemization.  Thus, measuring the ratio of D to L in a sample enables one to estimate how long ago the specimen died.

See also

 Astronomical chronology
 Age of the Earth
 Age of the universe

 Chronological dating, archaeological chronology
 Absolute dating, this article
 Relative dating
 Phase (archaeology)
 Archaeological association

 Geochronology
 Chronostratigraphy
 Future of the Earth
 Geologic time scale
 Geological history of Earth
 Plate reconstruction
 Plate tectonics
 Thermochronology
 Timeline of natural history
 List of geochronologic names

 General
 Consilience, evidence from independent, unrelated sources can "converge" on strong conclusions

References

Further reading

 Chronometric dating in archaeology, edited by R.E. Taylor and Martin J. Aitken.  New York: Plenum Press (in cooperation with the Society for Archaeological Sciences).  1997.
 

Geochronology
Dating methods